Olivier Suray (born 16 October 1971) is a Belgian football manager and former professional player who played for several clubs in Europe.

In 2006, he was implicated in a match-fixing scandal involving Chinese business executive Zheyun Ye.

Club career
Suray had a spell in the Turkish Süper Lig with Altay S.K. and Adanaspor and several seasons in the Belgian First Division with R. Charleroi S.C., R.S.C. Anderlecht and R.A.E.C. Mons.

References

External links
 Guardian's Stats Centre
 

1971 births
Living people
Sportspeople from Namur (city)
Association football defenders
Belgian footballers
Belgian football managers
R. Charleroi S.C. players
R.S.C. Anderlecht players
Standard Liège players
R.A.A. Louviéroise players
K.S.K. Beveren players
R.A.E.C. Mons players
Altay S.K. footballers
Adanaspor footballers
Expatriate footballers in Turkey
Sportspeople involved in betting scandals
Footballers from Namur (province)